Johan Plat (born 26 February 1987) is a Dutch former footballer who played as a striker. He formerly played for FC Volendam, FC Zwolle, FC Dordrecht, FC Oss, Telstar, Hansa Rostock, Roda JC Kerkrade and VV Katwijk.

External links

1987 births
Living people
Dutch footballers
Dutch expatriate footballers
Eerste Divisie players
Derde Divisie players
3. Liga players
AZ Alkmaar players
FC Volendam players
PEC Zwolle players
FC Dordrecht players
TOP Oss players
SC Telstar players
FC Hansa Rostock players
Roda JC Kerkrade players
Dutch expatriate sportspeople in Germany
Expatriate footballers in Germany
People from Purmerend
Association football forwards
Footballers from North Holland